Ignition may refer to:

Science and technology
 Firelighting, the human act of creating a fire for warmth, cooking and other uses
 Combustion, an exothermic chemical reaction between a fuel and an oxidant
 Fusion ignition, the point at which a nuclear fusion reaction becomes self-sustaining
 Ignition SCADA, software by Inductive Automation

Arts and entertainment
 Ignition (video game), a top-down racing game for PC published in 1997
 Ignition (2001 film), directed by Yves Simoneau
 Ignition Entertainment, a computer video games company founded in 2002
 Ignition! An Informal History of Liquid Rocket Propellants, (1972) by John Drury Clark
 Spyro Reignited Trilogy, a video game based on the original Spyro trilogy published in 2018

Music

Albums and EPs
 Ignition (B1A4 album), 2012
 Ignition (Darude album), 2001
 Ignition (John Waite album), 1982
 Ignition (Mark Boals album), 1998
 Ignition (Nicky Romero album), 2014
 Ignition (The Offspring album), 1992
 Ignition (The Music Machine album)
 Ignition!, album by Brian Setzer, 2001
 Ignition, an album by American rapper X-Raided, 2007
 Ignition (EP), a 2012 EP by Unisonic

Songs
 "Ignition (Remix)", a 2002 song by R. Kelly
 "Ignition", a song by Trivium from the album The Crusade, 2006
 "Ignition", a song by tobyMac from the album Portable Sounds, 2007–08
 "Ignition", a 2013 song by Dutch DJ and producer Nicky Romero.

Vehicles
 Ignition system, a method for activating and controlling the combustion of fuel in an internal combustion engine.
 Ignition switch, a switch in the control system of a motor vehicle that activates the main electrical systems for the vehicle, i

Other uses
 Ignition (event), a Burning Man regional event held in Montreal, Quebec, Canada
 Ignition (student training), a transition and mentorship program that is implemented in high schools across the US

See also
 National Ignition Facility, fusion research facility at the Lawrence Livermore National Laboratory in Livermore, California, US
 Ignition coil, an induction coil in an automobile's ignition system that raises the battery's voltage to the levels necessary for a spark to ignite the fuel
 High energy ignition, an electronic ignition system used by General Motors from 1974 to the mid-1980s
 Ignition interlock device, a method for preventing a vehicle's engine starting if a driver is over the legal alcohol limit
 Ignite (disambiguation)
 Flammability limit
 Lower flammable limit